During the 1995–96 English football season, Southampton Football Club competed in the FA Premier League.

Season summary
Amidst rumours of lack of support from the board, Alan Ball was lured to Manchester City in the summer of 1995 and Southampton turned to long-serving coach David Merrington to take charge of the team in 1995–96. Southampton finished 17th with 38 league points, avoiding relegation on goal difference. Two important wins during the final weeks of the season did much to ensure that Saints achieved Premiership survival and relegating Manchester City. First came a 3–1 home win over eventual double winners Manchester United, then came a 1–0 away win over relegated Bolton Wanderers. Despite achieving survival, Merrington was then sacked as manager after just one season and replaced by Graeme Souness, who had won silverware earlier in his managerial career with Rangers and Liverpool.

Final league table

Results
Southampton's score comes first

Legend

FA Premier League

FA Cup

League Cup

Squad

Left club during the season

Reserve squad

Transfers

In

Out

Transfers in:  £1,000,000
Transfers out:  £115,000
Total spending:  £885,000

References

Southampton F.C. seasons
Southampton